Camberwell North West was a borough constituency located in the Metropolitan Borough of Camberwell, in South London.  It returned one Member of Parliament (MP) to the House of Commons of the Parliament of the United Kingdom, elected by the first-past-the-post voting system.

The constituency was created for the 1918 general election, and abolished for the 1950 general election.

Boundaries

The Metropolitan Borough of Camberwell wards of Addington, Lyndhurst, St Giles, Town Hall, and West.

Members of Parliament

Election results

Election in the 1910s

Election in the 1920s

Election in the 1930s

Election in the 1940s

See also
 Camberwell North (UK Parliament constituency)
 Metropolitan Borough of Camberwell

References
 
 

Parliamentary constituencies in London (historic)
Constituencies of the Parliament of the United Kingdom established in 1918
Constituencies of the Parliament of the United Kingdom disestablished in 1950
Politics of the London Borough of Southwark
Camberwell